"Beautiful Thing" is the second single of Dutch pop singer Do from her second album, Follow Me.

Track listing
CD single
"Beautiful Thing"
"When Everything Is Gone"

Video
The video was shot in Bonaire. It was the first video shot there. On Bonaire Do shot two videos, one for "Beautiful Thing" and the other for "Sending Me Roses". In "Beautiful Thing" she's singing about how good love is, but in "Sending Me Roses" she is over that. So, it's a continuing story, with "Beautiful Thing" being part 1 and "Sending Me Roses" being part 2.

Charts

External links
 Video on Youtube
 Official website

2004 singles
Do (singer) songs
2006 songs
Sony BMG singles